The 2010 Ibero-American Championships in Athletics (Spanish: XIV Campeonato Iberoamericano de Atletismo) was an athletics competition which was held at the Estadio Municipal Bahía Sur in San Fernando, Cádiz, Spain from 4–6 June. A total of 44 events were contested, of which 22 by male and 22 by female athletes. A total of 459 athletes from 29 nations participated in the championships. Twelve championships records were set at the fourteenth edition of the competition.

Cuba topped the medal table with 15 golds and 25 medals in total. The hosts, Spain, were runners-up with 11 golds and 31 medals overall, while Brazil took third place in the final tally. The event was held to coincide with the city's celebration of the 200th anniversary of the meetings of the Cortes of Cádiz, which paved the way towards the liberation of Spanish America.

Brazil's Fabiana Murer provided the highlight of the championships by winning the pole vault with a South American record of 4.85 m – placing her in fourth on the all-time lists. Nilson André scored a sprint double by taking the men's 100 and 200 metres titles. The men's 4×400 metre relay provided Cubans Yeimer López and Omar Cisneros with their second gold medals of the competition, after having won the 800 metres and 400 metres hurdles, respectively. Jessica Augusto of Portugal set a championship record of 8:46.59 in the 3000 metres, along with winning a bronze medal in the 1500 metres.

Records

Medal summary

Men

Women

Medal table

Participating nations
The participation of all twenty-nine members Asociación Iberoamericana de Atletismo was a new record high for the championships. The level of athlete participation was also high: 449 athletes competed at the event, which was the second highest in history after the 1992 championships.

 (2)
 (3)
 (36)
 (2)
 (70)
 (5)
 (15)
 (20)
 (4)
 (32)
 (6)
 (8)
 (3)
 (1)
 (5)
 (3)
 (28)
 (2)
 (2)
 (3)
 (3)
 (7)
 (49)
 (20)
 (7)
 (3)
 (83)
 (5)
 (22)

References

External links
Official website (archived)

Ibero-American Championships in Athletics
Ibero-American
International athletics competitions hosted by Spain
Ath
Sport in San Fernando, Cádiz
June 2010 sports events in Europe